UTC−09:00 is an identifier for a time offset from UTC of −09:00. This time is used in:

As standard time (Northern Hemisphere winter)
Principal cities: Anchorage

North America
United States
Alaska
Except Aleutian Islands west of 169.30°W
Hall Island (Alaska), at longitude 173°06′W, is the westernmost area of Alaska that observes UTC−09:00, but is far west of the theoretical zone limits (−142.5° to −127.5° longitude). Its position equates to a mean solar time of UTC−11:32. The westernmost inhabited place in Alaska that observes UTC-09:00 is Gambell on the Northwest Cape of St. Lawrence Island, which is at 171°42′W.

As daylight saving time (Northern Hemisphere summer)Principal settlement: AdakNorth America
United States
Alaska
Aleutian Islands west of 169.30°W

As standard time (year-round)Principal settlement: Rikitea''

Oceania

Pacific Ocean

Polynesia 
France
French Polynesia
Gambier Islands

References

External links

UTC offsets

es:Huso horario#UTC−09:00, V